Staffordshire University Academy formerly known as Blake Valley Technology College (until 2003 called Blake High School) is a coeducational secondary school and sixth form located in Marston Road, Hednesford, Staffordshire, England. The school is sponsored by Staffordshire University and has recently moved into new buildings.

References

External links 
Official website

Secondary schools in Staffordshire
Academies in Staffordshire
Hednesford
Staffordshire University